The Gruppo Sportivo Fiamme Rosse is the sport section of the Italian firefighter force Vigili del Fuoco.

History
The vigili del fuoco (in english firefighters) have been engaged in sports since 1919 when they still called themselves Civici pompieri.

Sports
 Rowing
 Wrestling
 Swimming
 Weightlifting
 Fencing
 Taekwondo
 Skeet shooting
 Diving

Main active athletes

See also
Vigili del Fuoco
Italian military sports bodies

References

External links
 Official website

 
Sports organizations established in 2013